Judge Himes (1900 – after 1908) was an American Thoroughbred racehorse that was foaled in Kentucky and was the winner of the 1903 Kentucky Derby. He was a chestnut colt sired by imported Esher out of the mare Lullaby (by the great racer Longfellow). He was bred at Hartland Stud in Kentucky and was bought by Charles Ellison in September 1901 for $1,700.

Judge Himes also won the Chicago Hawthorne Handicap, Whirlpool Stakes, and Oak Park Handicap and raced until he was five years old. He was sold in New Orleans to turfman Phill Chin in March 1906 for use as a breeding stallion. Judge Himes was listed in a 1908 advertisement for the Heartland Stud Farm. He was auctioned on March 23, 1908, at Callahan's Stables in Warrenton, Virginia, and sired a few half-bred foals for the farm.

Pedigree

References

1900 racehorse births
Racehorses bred in Kentucky
Racehorses trained in the United States
Kentucky Derby winners
Thoroughbred family A36